The 1990 Long Beach State 49ers football team represented California State University, Long Beach during the 1990 NCAA Division I-A football season.

Cal State Long Beach competed in the Big West Conference. The team was led by ex-NFL head coach George Allen, and played home games at Veterans Stadium on the campus of Long Beach City College in Long Beach, California. The 49ers offense scored 249 points while the defense allowed 331 points.

Allen died shortly after the end of the 1990 season and was inducted posthumously into the Pro Football Hall of Fame in 2002.

Schedule

Team players in the NFL
The following were selected in the 1991 NFL Draft.

Notes

References

Long Beach State
Long Beach State 49ers football seasons
Long Beach State 49ers football